Bärbel Bas (born 3 May 1968) is a German politician of the Social Democratic Party (SPD) who has served as the President of the Bundestag since 2021. She has been a member of the German Bundestag since the federal election in 2009. She served as the deputy chairwoman of the SPD parliamentary group under the leadership of chairman Rolf Mützenich from 2019 to 2021.

Early life and career
Bas was born in the Walsum district of Duisburg. In 1984, she obtained her secondary school diploma. From 1985 to 1987 she served an apprenticeship as an office assistant at the Duisburger Verkehrsgesellschaft (DVG), where she worked from 1987 to 2001 as a clerk, and later moved to the company's own health insurance. From 1986 to 1988 she was a representative of youth and trainees at DVG and from 1988 to 1998 member of the works council and employee representative on the supervisory board of DVG.

From 1994 to 1997, Bas completed a vocational training as a social security specialist. That was followed, in 2000–2002, by an in-service training as a health insurance business administrator and the instructor diploma 2003. From 2002 to 2006 she was a deputy board member of the health insurance fund EVS. From 2005 to 2007, she completed further training as a human resources economist (VWA) at the Administrative and Business Academy Essen. Subsequently, Bas served as Head of the Department of Personnel Services at the BKK Futur from 2007 to 2009.

Political career
In October 1988, Bas joined the SPD. A year later she became a member of the Jusos sub-district board Duisburg, of which she was chairwoman from 1990 to 1998. Since then she has been a member of the subdistrict board of the Duisburg SPD. She served as deputy chairwoman since 2006. Since 2004, she has been a member of the Regional Council Niederrhein, since 2009 a member of the RuhrSPD and since 2010 chairwoman of the SPD state party council in North Rhine-Westphalia.

From 1994 to 2002 Bärbel Bas was a member of the City Council of Duisburg.

Member of Parliament: 2009–present

In the 2009 federal election, Bas was elected in the constituency of Duisburg I for the SPD as an MP in the 17th German Bundestag. In the 2013 federal election and in the 2017 federal election, she was able to defend her direct mandate. In the 17th Bundestag she was a full member of the Committee on Health, to which she continued to be a deputy member since in the 18th Bundestag. Since 2014, she has been a member of the parliament's Council of Elders, which – among other duties – determines daily legislative agenda items and assigns committee chairpersons based on party representation. She is also a deputy member of the Gemeinsamer Ausschuss (Joint Committee) of the Bundesrat and Bundestag.

Within her parliamentary group, Bas belongs to the left party wing of the SPD, the Parliamentary Left (Parlamentarische Linke). From December 2013 until 2017, she served as Parliamentary Director (Parlamentarischer Geschäftsführer, Chief whip) of the SPD parliamentary group. Bas later served as the group´s deputy chairwoman under the leadership of chairman Rolf Mützenich from 2019 until 2021.

In addition to her committee assignments, Bas is a member of the Parliamentary Friendship Group for Relations with the States of Central America.

President of the Bundestag: 2021–present
On 26 October 2021, Bas was elected as the 14th President of the Bundestag for the 20th Bundestag, with 576 votes for, 90 against, and 58 abstentions. Bas is the third female Bundestag president, after Annemarie Renger (SPD) and Rita Süssmuth (CDU).

Other activities

Corporate boards
 Hüttenwerke Krupp Mannesmann, Member of the Supervisory Board (since 2015)
 Gesellschaft für Wirtschaftsförderung Duisburg mbH, Member of the Supervisory Board (until 2013)
 Stadtwerke Duisburg AG, Member of the Supervisory Board (until 2013)

Non-profit organizations
 Humanitarian Aid Foundation for Persons infected with HIV through Blood Products (HIV Foundation), Member of the Board
 German United Services Trade Union (ver.di), Member
 MSV Duisburg, Member

Foreign honors
 :
 Grand Cross of the Order of Isabella the Catholic (11 October 2022)
 :
 Member 2nd Class of the Order of Prince Yaroslav the Wise (21 October 2022)

References

External links

|-

1968 births
21st-century German women politicians
Female members of the Bundestag
Living people
Members of the Bundestag 2009–2013
Members of the Bundestag 2013–2017
Members of the Bundestag 2017–2021
Members of the Bundestag 2021–2025
Members of the Bundestag for North Rhine-Westphalia
Members of the Bundestag for the Social Democratic Party of Germany
People from Duisburg
Women Presidents of the Bundestag
Dames Grand Cross of the Order of Isabella the Catholic